WHOP (1230 kHz) is an AM radio station broadcasting a news–talk format. Licensed to and serving Hopkinsville, Kentucky, United States, the station serves the Clarksville–Hopkinsville area. The station is currently owned by Forcht Broadcasting.

History 
The station first began broadcasting on January 6, 1940. The station was presided by Pierce Lackey, who had operated WPAD radio in Paducah in the 1930s, with Hecht S. Lackey serving as station manager until Henderson’s WSON went on the air in December 1941. F. Ernest Lackey became WHOP manager at that time. 

For its first year on the air, WHOP originally started broadcasting at 1200 kilohertz with 250 watts of power from a transmitter located on Princeton Road (State Highway 91). However, due to the North American Regional Broadcasting Agreement of 1941, the station reallocated its AM signal to their current frequency of 1230 kilohertz. Their original frequency became a treaty frequency under the NARBA that was assigned to a Clear-channel station; in this case, WOAI of San Antonio, Texas took the 1200 AM allocation.  

Also in the early 1940s, WHOP was one of the first radio stations in Kentucky to expand agriculture news briefs into complete farm shows. In 1943, WHOP became affiliated with CBS Radio, and that affiliation remains with the station to this day. Then, in 1948, the station launched WHOP-FM at 98.7 megahertz to simulcast the AM signal. That simulcast lasted for ten years before becoming a separate entity. The station has also been serving as a longtime affiliate of the University of Kentucky’s UK Sports Network, broadcasting football and basketball games since that network began in 1969.

Recent developments

Sometime in the early 2010s, WHOP had launched low-powered FM translator W237BV to simulcast the station’s AM signal onto 95.3 megahertz.

Programming 
As a news-talk-information format radio station, WHOP's programming content includes local newscasts, and public affairs programs. Syndicated radio programs on WHOP include The Rush Limbaugh Show, The Dave Ramsey Show, Coast to Coast AM, and America in the Morning. Hourly national news updates are provided by CBS News Radio. WHOP also provides programming from Premiere Radio Networks.

Sports programming 
Sports programming on WHOP-AM includes regionally syndicated sports packages of live coverage of games, including:
MLB Cincinnati Reds baseball from the Cincinnati Reds Radio Network (April–October)
University of Kentucky Wildcats football, men's, and women's basketball games from the UK Sports Network (September–March), and 
NHL's Nashville Predators hockey from the Predators Radio Network (October–May).

Translator

References

External links
WHOP-AM Website 

Radio stations established in 1940
HOP
Hopkinsville, Kentucky
News and talk radio stations in the United States
1940 establishments in Kentucky